Kashkuiyeh (also Romanized as Kashkū’īyeh) is a village in Sarduiyeh Rural District, Sarduiyeh District, Jiroft County, Kerman Province, Iran. At the 2006 census, its population was 44, in 9 families.

References 

Populated places in Jiroft County